Sir Thomas Noon Talfourd SL (26 May 179513 March 1854) was an English judge, Radical politician and author.

Life
The son of a well-to-do brewer, Talfourd was born in Reading, Berkshire. He received his education at Hendon and Reading School. At the age of 18, he was sent to London to study law under Joseph Chitty, a special pleader. Early in 1821, he joined the Oxford circuit, having been Called to the Bar at Middle Temple earlier in the year. Fourteen years later, he was created a serjeant-at-law and led the court with William Fry Channell until 1846, when serjeants lost their monopoly of audience. In 1849 he succeeded Thomas Coltman as judge of the Court of Common Pleas.

In politics
At the general election in 1835 he was elected MP for the Parliamentary Borough of Reading as a Radical, a result repeated in the general election of 1837. He chose not to run in the general election of 1841, but stood again in the general election of 1847 and was elected. In the House of Commons, Talfourd introduced a copyright bill in 1837, but the dissolution of Parliament in 1837 following the death of William IV meant that it had to be reintroduced in the new Parliament in 1838. By that time, the bill was met with strong opposition. Talfourd re-introduced it again in 1839, 1840 and 1841. It finally became law in 1842, albeit in modified form, and at a time when Talfourd was not in Parliament. Charles Dickens dedicated The Pickwick Papers to Talfourd.

Literary work 
In his early years in London, Talfourd was dependent in great measure on his literary contributions. He was then on the staff of The London Magazine, and was an occasional contributor to the Edinburgh Review and Quarterly Review, the New Monthly Magazine, and other periodicals; on joining the Oxford circuit, he acted as law reporter to The Times. His legal writings on literary matters are excellent expositions, animated by a lucid and telling, if not highly polished, style. Among the best of these are his article On the Principle of Advocacy in the Practice of the Bar (in the Law Magazine, January 1846); his Proposed New Law of Copyright of the Highest Importance to Authors (1838); Three Speeches delivered in the House of Commons in Favour of an Extension of Copyright (1840); and Speech for the Defendant in the Prosecution, the Queen v. Moxon, for the Publication of Shelley's Poetical Works (1841), a celebrated defence of Edward Moxon.

Talfourd's tragedy Ion was privately printed in 1835 and produced the following year at Covent Garden theatre. It was also well received in America, and was revived at Sadler's Wells Theatre in December 1861. His dramatic poem turns on the voluntary sacrifice of Ion, king of Argos, in response to the Delphic oracle, which had declared that only with the extinction of the reigning family could the prevailing pestilence incurred by the deeds of that family be removed.

Two years later, at the Haymarket Theatre, The Athenian Captive was acted with moderate success. In 1839 Glencoe, was privately printed, and in 1840 it was produced at the Haymarket. The Castilian (1853) did not excite much interest.

Talfourd also wrote:

"History of Greek Literature", in the Encyclopædia Metropolitana
The Letters of Charles Lamb, with a Sketch of his Life (1837)
Recollections of a First Visit to the Alps (1841)
Vacation Rambles and Thoughts, comprising recollections of three Continental tours in the vacations of 1841, 1842, and 1843 (2 vols., 1844)
Final Memorials of Charles Lamb (1849–50)

Death 

Talfourd died in 1854 in Stafford, after an apoplectic seizure in court while addressing the jury from his judge's seat at the town's Shire Hall, where he is commemorated by a bust, sculpted by John Graham Lough.

Dickens was amongst the mourners at his funeral at West Norwood Cemetery.

Family
Talfourd married Rachel, daughter of John Towill Rutt. Francis Talfourd ("Frank") was their eldest son.

Notes

References

External links

 

Justices of the Common Pleas
Members of the Parliament of the United Kingdom for English constituencies
People educated at Reading School
People from Reading, Berkshire
Members of the Parliament of the United Kingdom for Reading
Serjeants-at-law (England)
UK MPs 1835–1837
UK MPs 1837–1841
UK MPs 1847–1852
1795 births
1854 deaths
Burials at West Norwood Cemetery